"If I Could Go!" is the first single released from American rapper Angie Martinez's second studio album, Animal House (2002). The track features rapper Sacario and singer Lil Mo and was produced by Rick Rock; Sacario co-wrote the song. It is Martinez's highest-charting song to date on the US Billboard Hot 100, peaking at number 15. The song won two Certified BDS Spin Awards for 50,000 radio spins and 100,000 radio spins.

Song information 
According to the album liner notes, "If I Could Go" was recorded at Battery Studios in New York City and Sacario's former recording studio "West Wing" in Connecticut. The song was mixed at Right Track Recording by Supa Engineer Duro.

Music video 
The video was directed by Film Director Steve Carr.

Track listings 
UK CD and 12-inch single, Australian CD single
 "If I Could Go!" (radio edit) – 3:58
 "If I Could Go!" (album version) – 4:06
 "Coast 2 Coast (Suavemente)" (hip hop version) – 3:28

European CD single
 "If I Could Go!" (album version) – 4:06
 "Coast 2 Coast (Suavemente)" (hip hop version) – 3:28

Credits and personnel 
Credits are lifted from the US promo CD liner notes.

Studios
 Recorded at West Wing Studios and Battery Studios
 Mixed at Right Track Studios (New York City)
 Mastered at Sterling Sound (New York City)

Personnel

 Angie Martinez – writing
 Jamar Austin – writing
 Ricardo Thomas – writing
 Cynthia Loving – writing
 Rick Rock – production
 D. Boog – recording
 Carlisle Young – recording
 Super Engineer Duro – mixing
 Chris Gehringer – mastering

Charts

Weekly charts

Year-end charts

Release history

Usage in media 
"If I Could Go!" is featured on The Transporter movie soundtrack. The song is included on the NBA Live 2003 video game soundtrack. The soundtrack sold 1.3 million copies, becoming the first video game soundtrack in history to be Certified Platinum by the RIAA, which led to it being inducted into the Guinness World Records as the "first officially-released video game soundtrack to be RIAA certified platinum". According to Guinness World Records, NBA Live 2003 Soundtrack went Platinum in only six months.

References 

2002 singles
2002 songs
Elektra Records singles
Lil' Mo songs
Songs written by Johntá Austin
Songs written by Lil' Mo
Songs written by Rick Rock